Bharat Ram Meghwal (born 11 January 1956) is an Indian politician belonging to the Indian National Congress. He was elected to the Lok Sabha, lower house of the Parliament of India from Ganganagar Rajasthan in 2009.

References

External links
Official  Profile on Lok Sabha website

Indian National Congress politicians
Living people
1956 births
India MPs 2009–2014
Lok Sabha members from Rajasthan
People from Alwar district
People from Sri Ganganagar
People from Hanumangarh district
Indian National Congress politicians from Rajasthan